Sinocyclocheilus brevis is a species of ray-finned fish in the genus Sinocyclocheilus. They live in temperate, freshwater climates in Asia. The maximum observed length is 12.0 cm.

References 

brevis
Fish described in 1992